Laura Maureen Morgan (born 18 December 1978) is an Irish former cricketer who played as a right-handed batter and right-arm medium bowler. She one One Day International for Ireland in 2002, against India.

References

External links 
 

1978 births
Living people
Irish women cricketers
Ireland women One Day International cricketers